Snapped: Killer Couples (known as Killer Couples from seasons 7 to 15) is an American true crime television series currently airing on the Oxygen Network. The program details couples who commit crimes together. The program is a spin-off of the Oxygen series Snapped and has a similar format to the Investigation Discovery program Wicked Attraction. As of summer 2022 the show has aired sixteen seasons, each with ten episodes. The current narrator is Anna Vocino.

Synopsis
The series is similar to parent show Snapped, except that each episode features a couple who have committed murder or attempted murder or have been accused of committing or attempting to commit murder. Like the original series, the program is presented in a documentary style, using a central voice-over narration by actress Anna Vocino, as well as interviews with people who have first-hand knowledge of the case.

Production
Snapped: Killer Couples first aired on March 10, 2013 with the episode, "Amanda Logue & Jason Andrews". The series is currently in its tenth season of production at Jupiter Entertainment. A successful spinoff of the original Snapped series, the show played an important part in Oxygen's transition to a completely crime-focused network in mid-2017. From 2016 to 2021, Oxygen simply referred to the program as Killer Couples, with no mention of the original Snapped series in the title. In the show's sixteenth season in 2022, Oxygen reverted back to using the series' original title Snapped: Killer Couples.

Episodes

Season 1 (2013)

Season 2 (2013–14)

Season 3 (2014)

Season 4 (2014–15)

Season 5 (2015)

Season 6 (2015)

Season 7 (2016)

Season 8 (2016)

Season 9 (2018)

Season 10 (2018–19)

Season 11 (2019)

Season 12 (2019)

Season 13 (2020)

Season 14 (2020)

Season 15 (2021)

Season 16 (2022)

References

2013 American television series debuts
2010s American documentary television series
2020s American documentary television series
2010s American crime television series
2020s American crime television series
English-language television shows
True crime television series
Oxygen (TV channel) original programming